Bilu (also Palestine Pioneers) was a Jewish movement whose goal was the agricultural settlement of the Land of Israel. Its members were known as Bilu'im.

Etymology
Originally the movement was called Davio, an acronym of the Hebrew words from the Book of Exodus: "Speak unto the children of Israel that they will go forward."The name was later changed by the movement's founder, Israel Belkind, to "Bilu", which is an acronym based on a verse from the Book of Isaiah (2:5) "" Beit Ya'akov Lekhu Venelkha ("House of Jacob, let us go [up]").

History
The wave of pogroms of 1881–1884 and antisemitic May Laws of 1882 introduced by Tsar Alexander III of Russia prompted mass emigration of Jews from the Russian Empire. On 6 July 1882, the first group of Bilu pioneers arrived in Ottoman Palestine. The group consisted of fourteen university students from Kharkiv led by Israel Belkind, later a prominent writer and historian.  The Bilu movement was powered by a group ethos amongst the explorers as opposed to the individual goals that motivated other pioneers to Ottoman Palestine. After a short stay at the Jewish farming school in Mikveh Israel, they joined Hovevei Zion ("Lovers of Zion") members in establishing Rishon LeZion ("First to Zion"), an agricultural cooperative on land purchased from the Arab village of Ayun Kara. Plagued by water shortages, illness and financial debt, the group abandoned the site within a few months. They then sought help from Baron Edmond James de Rothschild and Maurice de Hirsch, who provided funding that led to the establishment of the local wine industry. In 1886, construction began on a winery in Rishon Lezion that became a successful wine-exporting enterprise.

In the winter of 1884, another group of Bilu pioneers founded Gedera. Gedera was established on a tract of land purchased from the Arab village of Qatra by Yehiel Michel Pines of the Hovevei Zion through the auspices of the French consul in Jaffa.

Movement goals 
The Bilu movement aimed to present its ideology to young Jews via six articles. The movement was looking to educate Jewish youth and share the notion that the Jews would be outsiders in any land outside of the land of Palestine, the native Jewish homeland. The Bilu movement sought to spread the ideology that if Jews were to give up their Jewish identities with the hopes of acceptance by their neighbors, they would never achieve true acceptance, and should therefore not relinquish their Jewish identity.

See also 
 Aliyah
 First Aliyah
 Gar'in
 Hechalutz
 Isaiah 2
 Yishuv
 Youth village

References

External links 

 A history of Israel: Bilu

 
Forerunners of Zionism
Jews and Judaism in Ottoman Palestine